Cincinnati chili (or Cincinnati-style chili) is a Mediterranean-spiced meat sauce used as a topping for spaghetti or hot dogs ("coneys"); both dishes were developed by immigrant restaurateurs in the 1920s. In 2013, Smithsonian named one local chili parlor one of the "20 Most Iconic Food Destinations in America". Its name evokes comparison to chili con carne, but the two are dissimilar in consistency, flavor, and serving method; Cincinnati chili more closely resembles Greek pasta sauces and spiced-meat hot dog topping sauces seen in other parts of the United States.

Ingredients include ground beef, water or stock, tomato paste, spices such as cinnamon, nutmeg, allspice, clove, cumin, chili powder, bay leaf, and in some home recipes unsweetened dark chocolate in a soupy consistency. Customary toppings include cheddar cheese, onions, and beans; specific combinations of toppings are known as "ways". The most popular order is a "three-way", which adds shredded cheese to the chili-topped spaghetti (a "two-way"), while a "four-way" or "five-way" adds onions and/or beans before topping with the cheese. Ways are often served with oyster crackers and a mild hot sauce. Cincinnati chili is almost never served or eaten by the bowl.

While served in many local restaurants, it is most often associated with the over 250 independent and chain "chili parlors" (restaurants specializing in Cincinnati chili) found throughout greater Cincinnati with franchise locations throughout Ohio and in Kentucky, Indiana, Florida, and the Middle East. The dish is the Cincinnati area's best-known regional food.

Origins and history

Cincinnati chili originated with immigrant restaurateurs who were trying to expand their customer base by moving beyond narrowly ethnic styles of cuisine. Tom and John Kiradjieff emigrated from the village of Hrupishta (present-day Argos Orestiko), fleeing ethnic rivalries and bigotry in the fallout from the Balkan Wars and World War I, in 1921. They began serving a "stew with traditional Mediterranean spices" as a topping for hot dogs which they called "coneys" in 1922 at their hot dog stand located next to a burlesque theater called the Empress, which they named their business after. Tom Kiradjieff used the sauce to modify a traditional dish, speculated to have been pastitsio, moussaka or saltsa kima to come up with a dish he called "chili spaghetti." He first developed a recipe calling for the spaghetti to be cooked in the chili but changed his method in response to customer requests and began serving the sauce as a topping, eventually adding grated cheese as a topping for both the chili spaghetti and the coneys, also in response to customer requests.

To make ordering more efficient, the brothers created the "way" system of ordering. The style has since been copied and modified by many other restaurant proprietors, often Greek and Macedonian immigrants who had worked at Empress restaurants before leaving to open their own chili parlors, often following the business model to the point of locating their restaurants adjacent to theaters.

Empress was the largest chili parlor chain in Cincinnati until 1949, when a former Empress employee and Greek immigrant, Nicholas Lambrinides, started Skyline Chili. In 1965, four brothers named Daoud, immigrants from Jordan, bought a restaurant called Hamburger Heaven from a former Empress employee. They noticed that the Cincinnati chili was outselling the hamburgers on their menu and changed the restaurant's name to Gold Star Chili. , Skyline (with over 130 locations) and Gold Star (with 89 locations) were the largest Cincinnati chili parlor chains, while Empress had only two remaining locations, down from over a dozen during the chain's most successful period.Besides Empress, Skyline, and Gold Star, there are also smaller chains such as Dixie Chili and Deli and numerous independents including the acclaimed Camp Washington Chili. Other independents include Pleasant Ridge Chili, Blue Ash Chili, Park Chili Parlor, Price Hill Chili, Chili Time, Orlando-based Cincinnati Chili Company, and the Blue Jay Restaurant, numbering more than 250 chili parlors.  In 1985, one of the founders of Gold Star Chili, Fahid Daoud, returned to Jordan, where he opened his own parlor, called Chili House. Outside of Jordan, Chili House as of 2020 had locations in Iran, Iraq, Libya, Oman, Palestine, Turkey and Qatar.

In addition to the chili parlors, some version of Cincinnati chili is commonly served at many local restaurants. Arnold's Bar and Grill, the oldest bar in the city, serves a vegetarian "Cincy Lentils" dish ordered in "ways". Melt Eclectic Cafe offers a vegan three-way. For Restaurant Week 2018, a local mixologist developed a cocktail called "Manhattan Skyline", a Cincinnati chili-flavored whiskey cocktail.

The history of Cincinnati chili shares many factors in common with the apparently independent but simultaneous development of the Coney Island hot dog in other areas of the United States. "Virtually all" were developed by Greek or Macedonian immigrants who passed through Ellis Island as they fled the fallout from the Balkan Wars in the first two decades of the twentieth century.

Preparation, ordering, serving and eating
Raw ground beef is crumbled and boiled in water and/or stock, then tomato paste and seasonings are added and the mix simmered for several hours to form a thin meat sauce. Cincinnati chili is always seasoned with cinnamon, allspice, cloves, cumin, nutmeg, and chili powder. Many home recipes call for a small amount of dark unsweetened chocolate, but according to Dann Woellert, author of The Authentic History of Cincinnati Chili, "There is no chili parlor in Cincinnati that uses chocolate in its chili." Many recipes call for an overnight chill in the refrigerator to allow for easy skimming of fat and to allow flavors to develop, then reheating to serve.

The "way" system

Ordering Cincinnati chili is based on a specific ingredient series: chili, spaghetti, shredded cheddar cheese, diced onions, and kidney beans. The number before the "way" of the chili determines which ingredients are included in each chili order. Customers order a:
 Two-way: spaghetti topped with chili (also called "chili spaghetti")
 Three-way: spaghetti, chili, and cheese
 Four-way onion: spaghetti, chili, onions, and cheese
 Four-way bean: spaghetti, chili, beans, and cheese
 Five-way: spaghetti, chili, beans, onions, and cheese

Some chili parlors will also serve the dish "inverted": cheese on the bottom, so that it melts. Some restaurants, among them Skyline and Gold Star, do not use the term "four-way bean", instead using the term "four-way" to denote a three-way plus the customer's choice of onions or beans.  Some restaurants may add extra ingredients to the way system; for example, Dixie Chili offers a "six-way", which adds chopped garlic to a five-way. Cincinnati chili is also used as a hot dog topping to make a "coney", a regional variation on the Coney Island chili dog, which is topped with shredded cheddar cheese to make a "cheese coney". The standard coney also includes mustard and chopped onion. The "three-way" and the cheese coney are the most popular orders.

Very few customers order a bowl of plain chili. Most chili parlors do not offer plain chili as a regular menu item. Polly Campbell, former food editor of The Cincinnati Enquirer, calls ordering a bowl of Cincinnati chili "Ridiculous. Would you order a bowl of spaghetti sauce? Because that's what you're doing."

Serving and eating
Ways and coneys are traditionally served in a shallow oval bowl. Oyster crackers are usually served with Cincinnati chili, and a mild hot sauce such as Tabasco is frequently available to be used as an optional topping to be added at the table. Locals typically eat Cincinnati chili as if it were a casserole, cutting each bite with the side of the fork instead of twirling the noodles.

Misnomer
The name "Cincinnati chili" is often confusing to those unfamiliar with it, because the term "chili" evokes the expectation of chili con carne, to which it "bears no resemblance". Cincinnati chili is a Mediterranean-spiced meat sauce for spaghetti or hot dogs, and is very seldom eaten by the bowl as is typical with chili con carne. It is common for Cincinnatians to describe it starting with, "Well, it's not really chili ..." Cincinnati Enquirer food editor Chuck Martin and Cincinnati Magazine dining editor Donna Covrett agree, "It is not chili." The 1991 edition of Joy of Cooking warns "skeptical or puzzled" readers, "We suggest you think of it as a Macedonian Bolognese sauce instead."

It is normally of a thin consistency, closer to a soup than a stew, and contains no vegetables or chunks of meat. The flavors, consistency and serving method are more similar to Greek pasta sauces or the spiced meat sauces used to top hot dogs in Rochester and other parts of Upstate New York, Rhode Island, and Michigan than they are to chili con carne.

Reception
Cincinnati chili is the area's "best known regional food" and according to Woellert is, along with goetta and mock turtle soup, one of Cincinnati's "holy trinity" of local specialties. Overall industry revenues were $250 million in 2014.

Anthony Bourdain called it "the story of America on your plate". National food critics Jane and Michael Stern wrote, "As connoisseurs of blue-plate food, we consider Cincinnati chili one of America's quintessential meals" and "one of this nation's most distinctive regional plates of food". Fran Lebowitz said "The main thing I remember about Cincinnati was a fantastic dish that was spaghetti and chili." When asked to confirm that the famously curmudgeonly Fran Lebowitz liked Cincinnati chili, she answered, "Oh, yes. Why isn’t that catching on around the country?” 

Huffington Post named it one of "15 Beloved Regional Dishes". In 2000, Camp Washington Chili won a James Beard Foundation America's Classics Award. In 2013, Smithsonian named Camp Washington Chili as one of "20 Most Iconic Food Destinations in America". John McIntyre, writing in The Baltimore Sun, called it "the most perfect of fast foods", and opined that "if the Greeks who invented it nearly a century ago had called it something other than chili, the [chili] essentialists would be able to enjoy it." In 2015, Thrillist named it "the one food you must eat in Ohio". In 2022 the Washington Post called it "a regional favorite worthy of a national stage".

Eater called it "America's most controversial plate of pasta". It is common for those unfamiliar with it and expecting chili con carne to "scorn it" as a poor example of chili. A 2013 piece published by the sports and culture website Deadspin went so far as to call it "horrifying diarrhea sludge". In 2021, during broadcast of a Cincinnati Reds–New York Mets game, Mets announcer Gary Cohen showed a video of the preparation of a five-way, advising, "try it once, and you'll never eat it again." The New York Times in 2017 described one chain's version of Cincinnati chili as "a gummy nest of thin noodles, which were covered by a watery chili, which was in turn covered by rubbery orange confetti that bore a passing resemblance to cheese".

In popular culture
Blues musician Lonnie Mack, who was born and raised just outside Cincinnati, released a guitar instrumental called "Camp Washington Chili" on his 1986 album Second Sight.

Country music duo Big & Rich sang about flying through Cincinnati and grabbing a bowl of Skyline chili in their song "Comin' to Your City" on the 2005 album of the same name.

Cincinnati chili is used allegorically as a symbol for vapid social interaction and social disconnection in the 2015 animated film Anomalisa, as the main character when on a business trip to Cincinnati is exhorted in multiple banal encounters to try the local specialty.

During the 2022 NFL postseason, Cincinnati Bengals fans shotgunned cans of chili for luck or took shots of chili in honor of kicker Evan McPherson, whose nickname is "shooter". Shotgunning cans of chili to celebrate or for luck in sporting events dates back to at least 2018, when a Cincinnati Reds fan used it to celebrate a trade.

Similar dishes 
 Chili dog, the generic term for a hot dog topped with meat sauce
 Chili John's, founded in Green Bay, Wisconsin, by a Lithuanian immigrant, offers "Green Bay chili", a dish similar to a five-way created in 1913
 Chili mac, which tops pasta with chili con carne rather than Cincinnati chili
 Coney Island hot dog, a dish similar to a coney developed by Greek-Macedonian immigrants, apparently independently, across the Midwest

See also

 Cuisine of the Midwestern United States
 List of regional dishes of the United States
 Filipino spaghetti, another example of a fusion-cuisine spaghetti dish
 Barbecue spaghetti, another fusion-cuisine spaghetti dish

References

External links
 

Cuisine of Cincinnati
Greek-American cuisine
Macedonian American history
Meat-based sauces
Spaghetti dishes
Hot dogs
Ground meat
Tomato sauces